Hole in the Mountain Peak is the highest mountain in the East Humboldt Range in Elko County, Nevada, United States. It is the thirty-fifth highest mountain in the state, and also ranks as the eleventh-most topographically prominent peak in the state. The U.S. Board on Geographic Names lists two variant names, Mount Bonpland and Mount Bonplant.

The window can be seen from I-80 and US 93.

Hiking or climbing to the window or to the peak can be attempted from either Starr Valley on the west side or from Clover Valley on the east side. Climbing to the window from Starr Valley is the easier of the two if approached from the basin right below the window. However, the route to the basin is long, generally unmarked, and is best accomplished on horseback with an outfitter in the area. After reaching the basin the round trip to the window can usually be accomplished within two hours.

Climbing to the window from Clover Valley is considerably more difficult but the window is constantly in view and much closer which may give the difficulty factor a deceptive appearance. But, with an appropriate high-clearance 4WD vehicle, the hiking distance before starting the climb is much less than the hiking distance when starting from Starr Valley.

Clover Valley is reached by driving south from Wells on US Highway 93 and  later turning onto State Route 232 to Clover Valley.  Six miles (9.7 km) later look for the Week's Creek Canyon turnoff sign on the right. This is a public access road that will lead to Lizzie's Basin and farther into the mountain towards Hole in the Mountain basin. Continue as far up the two wheel track road as your vehicle will take you. There are no trails so you must determine your own best route up the mountain. It will be immediately apparent that any direct route to the window is a very difficult task, even dangerous.

Instead, make your way up to Hole in the Mountain Peak, located a short distance to the north and an easier climb, and then make the approach to the window from the west side of the mountain.

Summit panorama

References

External links 

 

East Humboldt Range
Mountains of Nevada
Mountains of Elko County, Nevada
Humboldt–Toiyabe National Forest